Pigalle Wonder was a racing greyhound during the late 1950s and early 1960s. He was the United Kingdom Greyhound of the Year and won the sports top accolade by winning the 1959 English Greyhound Derby.

1956
He was whelped in March 1956 and bred by Tom Murphy in County Kilkenny, and was reared under the name Prairie Champion.

1957
His first race was on 10 October 1957, when he participated in the McCalmont Cup at Kilkenny under the name of Prairie Champion. He won his heat by ten lengths in 29.80 seconds and then won the final. After recording 29.10 seconds in a 525 yards trial at Harold's Cross Stadium he was bought by Al Burnett, who was known for owning the Pigalle Club in London.

1958
He was subsequently renamed Pigalle Wonder and was moved to Jim Syder Jr. as his trainer at Wembley. After being defeated in the inaugural BBC Sportsview TV Trophy at odds of 1-4f, he won the 1958 Derby in fine style setting a track record on the way to winning the event. 

During 1958, he also won the Pall Mall Stakes at Harringay Stadium, the Edinburgh Cup and the Cesarewitch (dead-heat), which culminated in him being voted the Greyhound of the Year.

1959
During 1959 he won the Anglo-Irish International, the Wood Lane Stakes and successfully defended his Edinburgh Cup title.

1960
He failed in the first round of the 1960 English Greyhound Derby before reaching the final of the 1960 Irish Greyhound Derby at Shelbourne Park

Retirement
Burnett sold Pigalle Wonder to stud during 1963 and he became a successful sire, with offspring that included Wonder Valley, Shady Begonia, Russian Gun. He died during January 1969.

Pedigree

References

Greyhound racing in the United Kingdom
Racing greyhounds
1956 animal births
1969 animal deaths